This article refers to sports broadcasting contracts in Portugal. For a list of broadcasting rights in other countries, see Sports television broadcast contracts.

Football

Portugal 

Liga NOS:
SportTV ( exclude Benfica home)
BTV (Benfica home only)
LEDMAN LigaPro:
SportTV
Canal 11
BTV (Benfica's Reserves home matches)
Porto Canal (FC Porto's Reserves home matches)
Liga 3:
Canal 11
Sporting TV (Sporting CP's Reserves home matches)
Next TV (SC Braga Reserve home matches)
Campeonato de Portugal
Canal 11
Allianz Cup:
SIC (final only)
SportTV (some matches)
Taça de Portugal 
RTP (FTA) (2022–23 and 2023–24)
Sport TV (pay-TV)
Canal 11 (selected live matches, semi-finals and final will be delayed to protect the cup's main rightsholders, as well as classic matches)
Supertaça Cândido de Oliveira
RTP (2023 and 2024)
TVI (2021 and 2022)
Portugal national football team:
RTP
SportTV
 Portugal national football team (U-20,U-19,U-18,U-17)
Canal 11

International 

 FIFA World Cup 2022:
TVI 
RTP 
SIC
SportTV (all matches)
 FIFA World Cup 2022 qualification:
RTP (Portugal matches only)
 SportTV (all matches)

FIFA Women's World Cup: RTP/RTP Play
FIFA Youth World Cups : RTP/RTP Play 
FIFA Club World Cup : Canal 11
UEFA Euro:
TVI 
RTP 
SIC
SportTV (all matches)

 UEFA Nations League (2018-2022):
RTP (Portugal matches and final)
 SportTV (all matches, including portugal team)

 UEFA National Team Friendly Matches (2018-2022):
RTP (Portugal matches only)
 SportTV (all matches, including portugal team)

UEFA European Under-21 Championship:
RTP (all 21 matches live on RTP Play)

UEFA Youth Championships: (all matches live on RTP Play, RTP1 only broadcast Portugal team)
UEFA European Under-19 Championship
 UEFA Women's Under-19 Championship
 UEFA European Under-17 Championship
 UEFA Women's Under-17 Championship

UEFA Champions League (2021-2024):
TVI (1 live match per match-day on Tuesdays)
Eleven Sports (every match)

UEFA Europa League (2021-2024):
SIC (1 live match per match-day)
SportTV (up to 4 live matches per match-day)

UEFA Europa Conference League (2021-2024):
SIC (1 live match per match-day)
SportTV (up to 2 live matches per match-day)

 UEFA Super Cup (2021-2023):
 TVI
 Eleven Sports

 UEFA Youth League (2021-2024):
Eleven Sports

UEFA Women's Champions League:
DAZN

CONMEBOL: SportTV
Copa América
Libertadores (2019-2022)
Sudamericana (2019-2022)
Recopa (2019-2022)

International Champions Cup: SportTV

Spain 

La Liga:
Eleven Sports (some matches)
Copa del Rey (2019-2022): SportTV
Supercopa de España (2019-2022): Eleven Sports

England 

Premier League (2022-2025): 
Eleven Sports
FA (2018-2021): SportTV
Cup
Community Shield

Italy 

Serie A (2021-2024): SportTV
Coppa Italia (2021-2024): SportTV
Supercoppa Italiana (2021-2022): SportTV

Germany 

DFL: Eleven Sports
Bundesliga
Supercup
DFB-Pokal: Eleven Sports

France 

Ligue 1: Eleven Sports

Other European Leagues 

Eredivisie: SportTV
Eliteserien: Eurosport
Argentine Primera División: SportTV
Campeonato Brasileiro Série A:
Canal 11
PFC
Copa do Brasil: Canal 11 (just the final)
Major League Soccer:  SportTV
Saudi Professional League: SportTV

Futsal
1ª Divisão de Futsal:
Canal 11
SportTV
FIFA Futsal World Cup
RTP (all 52 matches live on RTP Play. Selected non-Portugal matches live on RTP2 and Portugal matches live on RTP1)
UEFA Under-19 Futsal Championship
RTP (all 15 matches live on RTP Play, RTP1 only broadcast Portugal team)
UEFA Women's Futsal Euro:
RTP (all final four matches live on RTP Play. RTP1 only broadcast Portugal team, for 2019)

UEFA Futsal Champions League
Eleven Sports 
Canal 11 
Portugal national futsal team:
Canal 11

Multi-discipline events
Olympic Games:
RTP
Eurosport
Paralympic Games:
RTP

Athletics
IAAF World Championships in Athletics: RTP, Eurosport
European Athletics Championships: RTP, Eurosport
Meia-Maratona de Lisboa: RTP
Portuguese Championship: RTP

Basketball
FIBA World Cup: Eleven Sports
EuroBasket: SportTV
Euroleague: SportTV
LPB: A Bola TV, RTP2, BTV, Porto Canal, Sporting TV
LPB Women's: A Bola TV
NBA: SportTV
Liga Endesa:  Eleven Sports

Cycling
Volta a Portugal: RTP
Volta ao Algarve: Eurosport 
Volta a Catalunya:  Eurosport
Vuelta a España:  Eurosport (All late stages)
Tour de France: RTP, Eurosport (All late stages)
Giro d'Italia: Eurosport (All late stages)
UCI ProTour: Eurosport (All late stages)
La Flèche Wallonne: Eurosport
Paris–Nice: Eurosport
Paris–Roubaix: Eurosport
Paris–Tours:  Eurosport
Liège–Bastogne–Liège: Eurosport
Critérium du Dauphiné: Eurosport
UCI World Championships: RTP

Golf
Ryder Cup: SportTV
U.S. Masters: SportTV
U.S. Open: SportTV
The Open Championship: SportTV
PGA Championship: SportTV
PGA Tour: SportTV
European Tour: SportTV
World Golf Championships: SportTV

Handball
EHF Champions League: SportTV
Andebol 1:
BTV (Benfica's home matches)
Porto Canal (FC Porto's home matches)
Sporting TV (Sporting CP's home matches)
A Bola TV (several matches)

Rink Hockey

 Rink Hockey Euroleague 
RTP
Portuguese Roller Hockey First Division:
A Bola TV (several matches)
Porto Canal (FC Porto's home matches)
Sporting TV (Sporting CP's home matches)
Benfica TV (Benfica's home matches)

Ice hockey
NHL: SportTV

American Football
NFL: Eleven Sports

Motorsport
Formula One: Sport TV
FIA Formula 2: Sport TV
FIA Formula 3: Sport TV
Formula E
Eurosport
MotoGP: Sport TV
Superbike World Championship: Eurosport
World Touring Car Championship: Eurosport
World Rally Championship: SportTV
Monster Energy NASCAR Cup Series: SportTV
NASCAR Xfinity Series: SportTV
NASCAR Camping World Truck Series: SportTV
Verizon IndyCar Series: SportTV
DTM: SportTV

Boxing
Dream Boxing: DAZN: October 2022 to October 2025, all fights
Golden Boy: DAZN
Matchroom: DAZN

Kickboxing
King of Kings: DAZN: October 2022 to October 2025, all fights

Mixed Martial Arts
Bellator MMA: SportTV
Bushido MMA: DAZN: October 2022 to October 2025, all fights
Ultimate Fighting Championship: SportTV

Rugby Union
Rugby World Cup: SportTV
Six Nations: SportTV
European Rugby Champions Cup: SportTV
ABSA Currie Cup: SportTV
ITM Cup: SportTV
Aviva Premiership: SportTV
Super Rugby: SportTV

Tennis
Australian Open: Eurosport
French Open: Eurosport
Davis Cup: SportTV
Fed Cup: SportTV
Wimbledon: SportTV
US Open: Eurosport
ATP World Tour Masters 1000: SportTV
ATP World Tour: SportTV
Estoril Open: TVI

Volleyball
Campeonato Nacional de Voleibol - A1: SportTV (one match per week), Benfica TV (Benfica's home matches)

Portugal
Sports television in Portugal